Events from the year 1748 in Great Britain.

Incumbents
 Monarch – George II
 Prime Minister – Henry Pelham (Whig)
 Parliament – 10th

Events
 28 March – a fire in the City of London causes over a million pounds worth of damage.
 August – Admiral Edward Boscawen commands a Royal Navy siege of Pondicherry.
 18 October – the Treaty of Aix-la-Chapelle ends the War of the Austrian Succession, by which Madras in India is restored to British rule in exchange for the fortress of Louisbourg in Canada with France.

Undated
 Adam Smith begins to deliver public lectures in Edinburgh.
 Henry Fielding organises the forerunner of the Bow Street Runners, with eight men at first.
 First uniforms of the Royal Navy introduced for commissioned officers and midshipmen.
 John Fothergill's pamphlet Account of the Sore Throat attended with Ulcers contains the first description of diphtheria.
 Holywell Music Room, Oxford, the first purpose-built concert hall in Europe, is opened.

Publications
 While in debtor's prison, John Cleland writes the erotic novel Fanny Hill (Memoirs of a Woman of Pleasure), the first part of which is published anonymously on 21 November.
 David Hume's philosophical treatise An Enquiry concerning Human Understanding.
 Samuel Richardson's anonymous epistolary novel Clarissa.
 Tobias Smollett's anonymous picaresque novel The Adventures of Roderick Random.
 James Thomson's poem The Castle of Indolence, shortly before his death.

Births
 15 February – Jeremy Bentham, philosopher and writer (died 1832)
 5 March – William Shield, violinist and composer (died 1829)
 10 March – John Playfair, scientist (died 1819)
 13 April – Joseph Bramah, inventor and locksmith (died 1814)
 28 May – Frederick Howard, 5th Earl of Carlisle (died 1825)
 August – James Sayers, caricaturist (died 1823)
 14 December – William Cavendish, 5th Duke of Devonshire (died 1811)

Unknown date
 George Dixon, sea captain and explorer (died 1796)
 Matchem, racehorse (died 1781)

Deaths
 14 March – George Wade, military leader (born 1673, Ireland)
 12 April – William Kent, architect, landscape architect and furniture designer (born c. 1685)
 12 May – Thomas Lowndes, astronomer (born 1692)
 27 August – James Thomson, poet (born 1700)
 6 September – Edmund Gibson, jurist (born 1669)
 12 September – Anne Bracegirdle, actress (born c.1671)
 21 September – John Balguy, philosopher (born 1686)
 October – Donald Cameron of Lochiel (born 1700)
 25 November – Isaac Watts, hymn writer (born 1674)
 2 December – Charles Seymour, 6th Duke of Somerset, politician (born 1662)

References

 
Years in Great Britain